T.A. Blakelock High School is the second oldest high school in the town of Oakville, Ontario, and has the oldest high school building in Oakville still in use as a school. The school was built in 1957. There are 1,001 students currently enrolled at T.A. Blakelock. The school is named after Thomas Aston Blakelock.

The school's athletic teams were originally known as the Tabbies, after the acronym TAB. They are now called the Tigers.
Blakelock is the only public high school in southwest Oakville, after the recent closing of Queen Elizabeth High School and the transfer of Gordon E. Perdue High School to the Catholic Board in 1990.

The current principal is Mr. Paul Dawson.

Blakelock is known for having an excellent music program. In 2013 their Senior Wind Ensemble and Grade 12 Percussion Ensemble both won Gold at MusicFest's Canadian National Music Festival.

Notable alumni
Dan Ferrone - CFL player, president of CFLPA, Canadian Football Hall of Fame inductee (2013) 
David Bradstreet - Musician
Arlene Duncan - (1974) Actress, singer; played Fatima in Little Mosque on the Prairie
Lindy Booth - (1997) Actress
Greg Westlake - (2004) Ice sledge hockey player

See also
List of high schools in Ontario

References

External links
 Official website

High schools in Oakville, Ontario
1957 establishments in Ontario
Educational institutions established in 1957